Sit Down Comedy with David Steinberg is an American talk show which aired on TV Land from 2005 to 2007. In it, comedian David Steinberg interviews comedians and comic actors.

Content
The show is an informal interview-based talk show in which David Steinberg talks with comedians and comic actors. Each show features Steinberg and one guest. Mike Myers was the guest on the first episode; also among those appearing were Jon Lovitz, George Lopez, Bob Newhart, Larry David, and Martin Short.

Critical reception
David Bianculli of the New York Daily News described the show as "amiable" and "comically conversational", noting that it had the potential to inform viewers on the art of comedy.

References

External links
 
 

2000s American comedy television series
2005 American television series debuts
2007 American television series endings
2000s American television talk shows
English-language television shows
TV Land original programming